John P. Connarn (July 8, 1917 – March 26, 2002) was a Vermont attorney and political figure who served as the state Attorney General.

Biography
John Patrick Connarn was born in Brattleboro, Vermont on July 8, 1917.  He graduated from Northfield High School, received his bachelor's degree from Norwich University in 1941 and joined the United States Army to serve during World War II. He attained the rank of captain, was wounded during combat in France, and remained in the Army until being discharged in 1947.

Connarn graduated from the University of Maine School of Law in 1951 and became an attorney in Northfield. A Democrat, he was elected to the Vermont House of Representatives in 1956 and served four two-year terms, 1957 to 1965. in 1964 he was elected Vermont Attorney General and served two years, 1965 to 1967.

In 1967, Connarn was appointed a Judge of the Vermont District Court, and he served until his retirement in 1985.

After leaving the bench, Connarn owned and operated Northfield's Margaret Holland Inn and served two terms on the local school board. He was a scout master in the local Boy Scout troop, president of the Norwich University Alumni Association, and was active in Northfield's American Legion Post.

Death and burial
Connarn died in Berlin, Vermont on March 26, 2002.  He was buried at Aldrich Cemetery in Northfield.

Family
He was married first to artist Alicia Stonebreaker and later to Stanislawa (Barbara) Prostacka Michalek. He was the father of two daughters and a son, as well as four stepsons.

References

1917 births
2002 deaths
People from Brattleboro, Vermont
People from Washington County, Vermont
Vermont lawyers
United States Army personnel of World War II
Norwich University alumni
University of Maine School of Law alumni
Democratic Party members of the Vermont House of Representatives
Vermont Attorneys General
20th-century American judges
Burials in Vermont
United States Army officers
Military personnel from Vermont
20th-century American politicians
20th-century American lawyers